Rhaphidophora is a genus in the family Araceae, occurring from tropical Africa eastwards through Malesia and Australasia to the Western Pacific. The genus consists of approximately 100 species.

Description
This is a genus of evergreen, robust, climbing plants. The flowers are bisexual, lacking a perigone. The spathe is shed after flowering. The ovules number eight or more and are superposed on two (rarely 3) parietal placentas of the ovary. The flowers produce many, ellipsoid, straight seeds with a brittle and smooth outer coat (testa).

These are hemiepiphytes, plants capable of beginning life as a seed and sending roots to the soil, or beginning as a terrestrial plant that climbs a tree and then sends roots back to the soil.  In rare cases they are terrestrial rheophytes (plants that grow in fast-flowing water).

Their bast fibers have typically abundant, long and slender trichosclereids, merging with the fibers of the sclerenchyma. If the blade of the leaf is torn, many hairs become apparent. The leaf stalks bend abruptly at their top. The leaf margin is entire. The leaves are pinnatifid to pinnatisect (cut with deep opposite lobing). The leaf venation is parallel (with veins running parallel for the length of the leaf), pinnate (one mid-vein with smaller veins branching off laterally) to reticulate (feather-veined).

Chemistry
Six compounds extracted from the  dried leaves and stems of Rhaphidophora decursiva have been shown to possess activity against one malarial parasite, Plasmodium falciparum. Polysyphorin and rhaphidecurperoxin showed the strongest antimalarial activity, while rhaphidecursinol A, rhaphidecursinol B, grandisin, and epigrandisin were less active. Rhaphidecursinol A and rhaphidecursinol B were determined to be neolignans, a major class of phytoestrogens, while rhaphidecurperoxin is a new benzoperoxide.

Heterotypic synonyms
 Raphidophora Hassk., Tijdschr. Natuurl. Gesch. Physiol. 9: 168 (1842), orth. var.
 Afrorhaphidophora Engl. in H.G.A.Engler & K.A.E.Prantl, Nat. Pflanzenfam., Nachtr. 3: 31 (1906).

Taxonomy
Research on the chloroplast DNA sequence data (trnL-F) has shown that Rhaphidophora and Epipremnum are paraphyletic, forming three informal groups with other genera of the paraphyletic tribe Monstereae. This may result in taxonomic changes in this genus. The genera Rhaphidophora, Epipremnum, and Monstera are poorly differentiated.

One cultivar, Rhaphidophora excelsa `Exotica' has been recognized.

Species

 Rhaphidophora acuminata  Merr., Philipp. J. Sci., C 10: 265 (1915).  
 Rhaphidophora africana  N.E.Br., Bull. Misc. Inform. Kew 1897: 286 (1897).  
 Rhaphidophora angustata  Schott, Ann. Mus. Bot. Lugduno-Batavi 1: 128 (1863).  
 Rhaphidophora araea  P.C.Boyce, Gard. Bull. Singapore 52: 116 (2000).  
 Rhaphidophora australasica  F.M.Bailey, Queensland Agric. J. 1: 453 (1897).  
 Rhaphidophora balgooyi  P.C.Boyce, Gard. Bull. Singapore 52: 118 (2000).  
 Rhaphidophora banosensis  P.C.Boyce, Gard. Bull. Singapore 52: 222 (2000 publ. 2001).  
 Rhaphidophora beccarii  (Engl.) Engl., Bot. Jahrb. Syst. 1: 181 (1881).  
 Rhaphidophora bogneri P.C.Boyce & Haigh
 Rhaphidophora bonii  Engl. & K.Krause in H.G.A.Engler, Pflanzenr., IV, 23B: 34 (1908).  
 Rhaphidophora brevispathacea  Engl. & K.Krause, Bot. Jahrb. Syst. 54: 79 (1916).  
 Rhaphidophora calophylla  Schott, Prodr. Syst. Aroid.: 380 (1860).  
 Rhaphidophora calophylla Schott
 Rhaphidophora chevalieri  Gagnep., Notul. Syst. (Paris) 9: 136 (1941).  
 Rhaphidophora conica  Engl., Bot. Jahrb. Syst. 1: 181 (1881).  
 Rhaphidophora conocephala  Alderw., Bull. Jard. Bot. Buitenzorg III, 1: 384 (1920).  
 Rhaphidophora corneri  P.C.Boyce, Gard. Bull. Singapore 51: 205 (1999).  
 Rhaphidophora crassicaulis  Engl. & K.Krause in H.G.A.Engler, Pflanzenr., IV, 23B: 52 (1908).  
 Rhaphidophora crassifolia  Hook.f., Fl. Brit. India 6: 543 (1893).  
 Rhaphidophora cravenschoddeana  P.C.Boyce, Gard. Bull. Singapore 53: 96 (2001).  
 Rhaphidophora cretosa  P.C.Boyce, Gard. Bull. Singapore 52: 228 (2000).  
 Rhaphidophora cryptantha  P.C.Boyce & C.M.Allen, Gard. Bull. Singapore 53: 99 (2001).  
 Rhaphidophora cylindrosperma  Engl. & K.Krause in H.G.A.Engler, Pflanzenr., IV, 23B: 28 (1908).  
 Rhaphidophora dahlii  Engl., Bot. Jahrb. Syst. 25: 8 (1898).  
 Rhaphidophora decursiva  (Roxb.) Schott, Bonplandia (Hannover) 5: 45 (1857).  
 Rhaphidophora discolor  Engl. & K.Krause, Bot. Jahrb. Syst. 54: 80 (1916).  
 Rhaphidophora dulongensis  H.Li, Acta Bot. Yunnan., Suppl. 5: 7 (1992).  
 Rhaphidophora elliptica  Ridl., J. Straits Branch Roy. Asiat. Soc. 44: 186 (1905).  
 Rhaphidophora elliptifolia  Merr., J. Straits Branch Roy. Asiat. Soc., Spec. No.: 88 (1921).  
 Rhaphidophora elmeri  Engl. & K.Krause, Bot. Jahrb. Syst. 44(101): 11 (1910).  
 Rhaphidophora falcata  Ridl., J. Straits Branch Roy. Asiat. Soc. 44: 198 (1905).  
 Rhaphidophora floresensis  P.C.Boyce, Gard. Bull. Singapore 52: 126 (2000).  
 Rhaphidophora foraminifera  (Engl.) Engl., Pflanzenr., IV, 23B: 45 (1908).  
 Rhaphidophora formosana  Engl., Bot. Jahrb. Syst. 25: 10 (1898).  
 Rhaphidophora fortis  P.C.Boyce, Gard. Bull. Singapore 53: 104 (2001).  
 Rhaphidophora geniculata  Engl., Bot. Jahrb. Syst. 25: 7 (1898).  
 Rhaphidophora glauca  (Wall.) Schott, Bonplandia (Hannover) 5: 45 (1857).  
 Rhaphidophora gorokensis  P.C.Boyce, Gard. Bull. Singapore 53: 111 (2001).  
 Rhaphidophora guamensis  P.C.Boyce, Gard. Bull. Singapore 53: 112 (2001).  
 Rhaphidophora hayi  P.C.Boyce & Bogner, Gard. Bull. Singapore 52: 91 (2000).  
 Rhaphidophora honkongensis  Schott, Prodr. Syst. Aroid.: 378 (1860).  
 Rhaphidophora hookeri  Schott, Prodr. Syst. Aroid.: 381 (1860).  
 Rhaphidophora intonsa  P.C.Boyce, Gard. Bull. Singapore 53: 119 (2001).  
 Rhaphidophora intrusa  P.C.Boyce, Gard. Bull. Singapore 53: 120 (2001).  
 Rhaphidophora jubata  P.C.Boyce, Gard. Bull. Singapore 53: 124 (2001).  
 Rhaphidophora kokodensis  P.C.Boyce, Gard. Bull. Singapore 53: 127 (2001).  
 Rhaphidophora koordersii Engl.
 Rhaphidophora korthalsii  Schott, Ann. Mus. Bot. Lugduno-Batavi 1: 129 (1863).  
 Rhaphidophora lacduongensis  V.D.Nguyen & B.H.Quang (2015)
 Rhaphidophora laichauensis  Gagnep., Notul. Syst. (Paris) 9: 137 (1941).  
 Rhaphidophora lancifolia Schott
 Rhaphidophora latevaginata  M.Hotta, Acta Phytotax. Geobot. 22: 4 (1966).  
 Rhaphidophora liukiuensis Hatus.
 Rhaphidophora lobbii  Schott, Prodr. Syst. Aroid.: 379 (1860).  
 Rhaphidophora luchunensis  H.Li, Acta Phytotax. Sin. 15(2): 103 (1977).  
 Rhaphidophora maingayi  Hook.f., Fl. Brit. India 6: 543 (1893).  
 Rhaphidophora megaphylla  H.Li, Acta Phytotax. Sin. 15(2): 102 (1977).  
 Rhaphidophora megasperma  Engl., Bot. Jahrb. Syst. 25: 8 (1898).  
 Rhaphidophora megastigma  Engl., Bot. Jahrb. Syst. 1: 180 (1881).  
 Rhaphidophora microspadix  K.Krause, Bot. Jahrb. Syst. 49: 92 (1912).  
 Rhaphidophora mima  P.C.Boyce, Gard. Bull. Singapore 53: 138 (2001).  
 Rhaphidophora minor  Hook.f., Fl. Brit. India 6: 544 (1893).  
 Rhaphidophora moluccensis  Engl. & K.Krause in H.G.A.Engler, Pflanzenr., IV, 23B: 36 (1908).  
 Rhaphidophora montana  (Blume) Schott, Ann. Mus. Bot. Lugduno-Batavi 1: 128 (1863).  
 Rhaphidophora monticola  K.Krause, Bot. Jahrb. Syst. 44(101): 12 (1910).  
 Rhaphidophora neglecta A.Hay & P.C.Boyce, Aroideana 42(2,3): 9 (2019).
 Rhaphidophora neoguineensis  Engl. in K.M.Schumann & U.M.Hollrung, Fl. Kais. Wilh. Land: 19 (1889).  
 Rhaphidophora nicolsonii  P.C.Boyce, Gard. Bull. Singapore 51: 236 (1999).  
 Rhaphidophora nicolsonii P.C.Boyce
 Rhaphidophora okapensis  P.C.Boyce & Bogner, Gard. Bull. Singapore 52: 94 (2000).  
 Rhaphidophora oligosperma  Alderw., Bull. Jard. Bot. Buitenzorg III, 4: 340 (1922).  
 Rhaphidophora ovoidea  A.Chev., J. Bot. (Morot) 22: 135 (1909).  
 Rhaphidophora pachyphylla  K.Krause, Bot. Jahrb. Syst. 49: 92 (1912).  
 Rhaphidophora parvifolia  Alderw., Bull. Jard. Bot. Buitenzorg III, 4: 338 (1922).  
 Rhaphidophora peepla  (Roxb.) Schott, Bonplandia (Hannover) 5: 45 (1857).  
 Rhaphidophora peeploides  Engl., Bot. Jahrb. Syst. 25: 7 (1898).  
 Rhaphidophora perkinsiae  Engl., Bot. Jahrb. Syst. 37: 115 (1905).  
 Rhaphidophora pertusa  (Roxb.) Schott, Bonplandia (Hannover) 5: 45 (1857).  
 Rhaphidophora petrieana  A.Hay, Telopea 5: 295 (1993).  
 Rhaphidophora philippinensis  Engl. & K.Krause in H.G.A.Engler, Pflanzenr., IV, 23B: 137 (1908).  
 Rhaphidophora pilosa  P.C.Boyce, Gard. Bull. Singapore 53: 151 (2001).  
 Rhaphidophora puberula  Engl., Bot. Jahrb. Syst. 1: 180 (1881).  
 Rhaphidophora pusilla N.E.Br.
 Rhaphidophora sabit  P.C.Boyce, Gard. Bull. Singapore 52: 161 (2000).  
 Rhaphidophora sarasinorum  Engl., Bot. Jahrb. Syst. 37: 114 (1905).  
 Rhaphidophora schlechteri  K.Krause, Bot. Jahrb. Syst. 49: 94 (1912).  
 Rhaphidophora schottii  Hook.f., Fl. Brit. India 6: 544 (1893). 
 Rhaphidophora sonlaensis  V.D.Nguyen & P.C.Boyce. 
 Rhaphidophora spathacea  Schott, Ann. Mus. Bot. Lugduno-Batavi 1: 129 (1863).  
 Rhaphidophora spuria  (Schott) Nicolson, Allertonia 1: 348 (1978).  
 Rhaphidophora stenophylla  K.Krause, Bot. Jahrb. Syst. 49: 94 (1912).  
 Rhaphidophora stolleana  Engl. & K.Krause, Bot. Jahrb. Syst. 54: 79 (1916).  
 Rhaphidophora sulcata Gagnep., Notul. Syst. (Paris) 9: 137 (1941).  
 Rhaphidophora sylvestris  (Blume) Engl. in A.L.P.de Candolle & A.C.P.de Candolle, Monogr. Phan. 2: 239 (1879).  
 Rhaphidophora talamauana  Alderw., Bull. Jard. Bot. Buitenzorg III, 1: 384 (1920).  
 Rhaphidophora tenuis  Engl., Bot. Jahrb. Syst. 1: 181 (1881).  
 Rhaphidophora ternatensis  Alderw., Bull. Jard. Bot. Buitenzorg III, 4: 194 (1922).  
 Rhaphidophora tetrasperma  Hook.f., Fl. Brit. India 6: 548 (1893).  
 Rhaphidophora teysmanniana  Engl. & K.Krause in H.G.A.Engler, Pflanzenr., IV, 23B: 35 (1908).  
 Rhaphidophora todayensis  K.Krause, Bot. Jahrb. Syst. 45: 658 (1911).  
 Rhaphidophora tonkinensis  Engl. & K.Krause in H.G.A.Engler, Pflanzenr., IV, 23B: 34 (1908).  
 Rhaphidophora typha  P.C.Boyce, Gard. Bull. Singapore 57: 211 (2005).  
 Rhaphidophora ustulata  P.C.Boyce, Gard. Bull. Singapore 52: 176 (2000).  
 Rhaphidophora versteegii  Engl. & K.Krause, Nova Guinea 8: 248 (1910).  
 Rhaphidophora waria  P.C.Boyce, Gard. Bull. Singapore 53: 174 (2001).  

Epipremnum aureum was once categorized in this genus.

 Rhaphidophora meranginensis  trio, merangin. jambi : (2022).

 Rhaphidophora lobbiisilver  trio, merangin. jambi : (2022).

Footnotes

References

External links
http://apps.kew.org/wcsp/home.do was used for this information
more information can be found on: https://web.archive.org/web/20080425004749/http://scratchpad.cate-araceae.org/  and  http://www.cate-araceae.org/
 Check the Complete Rhaphidophora Tetrasperma Care Guide

 
Araceae genera
Taxonomy articles created by Polbot